Kennemerland is a coastal region in the northwestern Netherlands, in the province of North Holland. It includes the sand dunes north of the North Sea Canal, as well as the dunes of Zuid-Kennemerland National Park.

History

Kennemerland gets its name from the Kennemer people, who were Frisians that fought with the Counts of Holland and lost in the Middle Ages. The name is said to derive from the Canninefates. Because of the wars and all of the Dutch activity in rerouting waterways, the original borders of Kennemerland have been lost. During the 20th century, the term Kennemerland has been redefined to denote municipal regions of North Holland. Because the Kennemers according to folklore were always on the attack, many sports teams in Haarlem are called Kennemers.

Precisely who were these Kennemer people is unclear. The knights of Kennemerlant, as it was then called, were quarreling continuously over trading rights and land ownership. The rent masters of local farmers were often asked for goods from either Egmond Abbey or their local church, as well as from these knights. In North Holland during the years 900–1300, castles were continuously being built and later destroyed, and archaeologists today are still trying to piece together the various local legends as they gain hard evidence from the cold clay.

Municipalities located in Kennemerland today

North Kennemerland
 Alkmaar (partly also in West Frisia)
 Dijk en Waard (the area of the former municipality of Heerhugowaard) (located completely in West Frisia)
 Bergen (including Egmond, former seat of the Counts of Holland)
 Castricum 
 Heiloo
 Uitgeest

Middle Kennemerland (IJmond) 
 Beverwijk
 Heemskerk
 Velsen

South Kennemerland
 Bloemendaal, with Thijsse's Hof (Garden of Thijsse), a wildlife garden with native plants of South Kennemerland.
 Haarlem (capital of North Holland)
 Haarlemmermeer
 Heemstede
 Zandvoort

See also

Gijsbrecht van Aemstel (play)
Zuid-Kennemerland National Park
Godfrid, Duke of Frisia
Floris V, Count of Holland

References

History of Haarlem
Regions of North Holland
Regions of the Netherlands